The 43rd Indian Brigade was an infantry brigade of the British Indian Army that formed part of the Indian Army during the First World War.  It was formed in March 1917 as part of the 16th Indian Division for service on the North West Frontier.  It remained in India throughout the First World War but saw active service in the Third Anglo-Afghan War.  Post-war, it was designated as 21st Indian Infantry Brigade in September 1920 and took over responsibility for the Jubbulpore Brigade Area in 1923.

History
From March 1916, it was intended to form a reserve division for the North West Frontier, but the urgent need to find troops for Mesopotamia meant that the 16th Indian Division was not formed until December 1916.  In March 1917, 43rd Indian Brigade was formed in the new division.  The brigade remained on the North West Frontier throughout the First World War but was mobilized with 16th Indian Division to take part in the Third Anglo-Afghan War.  

In September 1920, the brigade was redesignated as 21st Indian Infantry Brigadenot to be confused with an identically designated but unrelated 21st Indian Infantry Brigade of the Second World War.  In 1923, the brigade took over responsibility for the Jubbulpore Brigade Area.

Orders of battle

Commanders
The 43rd Indian Brigade / 21st Indian Infantry Brigade had the following commanders:

See also

 21st Indian Infantry Brigade of the Second World War
 43rd Indian Infantry Brigade of the Second World War

Notes

References

Bibliography

External links
 

Brigades of India in World War I
Military units and formations established in 1917
Military units and formations disestablished in 1923